The IMOCA 60 Class yacht LinkedOut, FRA 79 was designed by Guillaume Verdier and launched on 9 July 2019 after being built Persico Marine based in Italy

Racing Results

References 

Individual sailing yachts
2010s sailing yachts
Sailboat type designs by Guillaume Verdier
Sailboat types built in Italy
Vendée Globe boats
IMOCA 60